Rhyno Christo Smith (born 11 February 1993) is a South African professional rugby union player for the Benetton in United Rugby Championship.
He usually plays as a fullback, but can also play as a fly-half or winger.

Rugby career

Leopards / NWU Pukke

2012 season

Smith was born and grew up in Paarl in the Western Cape, but never earned a provincial call-up while at high school level. Upon finishing school, he moved to Potchefstroom where he joined the  academy. He was included in the  squad that participated in the 2012 Under-19 Provincial Championship, making ten appearances and scoring 38 points for his side that finished in fifth position on the log. He scored three tries during the competition in matches against  on his debut, against  in his second match and against .

2013 season

2014 season

Smith was included in the university team 's squad for the 2014 Varsity Cup and was named in the matchday squad for all nine of their matches, but made just two starts and five appearances as a replacement. His side finished top of the log to qualify for the semi-finals. Smith scored just two points throughout the season, but it proved to be absolutely vital, as he kicked a last-minute penalty in their match against  in the semi-final in a 19–18 victory. He was an unused replacement in the final, which  won in dramatic fashion as they fought back from 33–15 down with five minutes to go to achieve a 39–33 victory. In the second half of 2014, Smith returned to the  squad for their 2014 Under-21 Provincial Championship campaign. He started their first eight matches of the competition, scoring 87 points to make him the Leopards' top scorer during the competition and the fifth top scorer overall.

He missed the team's run-in to the season after being promoted to the senior team, playing in the 2014 Currie Cup First Division. They faced the Falcons for the second consecutive week in their semi-final encounter; Smith scored two first-half tries, but it was not enough for the home side, as the Falcons avenged their defeat from a week earlier to win 31–24, eliminating the Leopards from the competition.

2015 season

Smith firmly established himself in the  team for the 2015 Varsity Cup, starting all nine of their matches. Smith's three penalties and one conversion proved crucial in their semi-final match against  as they won 29–28 to qualify for their second successive final. However, as in 2014, Smith find himself on the losing side in the final, as Bloemfontein-based university  easily won 63–33 in the final. In total, Smith scored 101 points during the competition to finish as the overall top scorer. He was named the Player That Rocks for the competition and also included in a Varsity Cup Dream Team that was named at the conclusion of the season. Smith scored a try (which was later nominated as the try of the season) and kicked a conversion in the Dream Team's defeat to the South Africa Under-20s as the latter prepared for the 2015 World Rugby Under 20 Championship.

The Leopards fell just short of qualifying for the 2015 Currie Cup Premier Division, finishing a single point behind Griquas, qualifying for the First Division instead. With the Leopards' only defeat in the qualification series to Griquas being expunged from their record in the First Division, the team won their remaining five matches to finish with a 100% record, winning all ten of their matches. Smith was nominated for First Division Player of the Year after his performances and won the award at a ceremony in early 2016.

2016 season

As in the previous two seasons, Smith started 2016 by playing Varsity Cup rugby for NWU Pukke. He started all nine of their matches, scoring 73 points, the third-highest points total in the competition. He was now firmly established as the side's first-choice kicker, with all his points coming with the boot. He helped the Pukke finish in third place on the log in a competition marred by on-campus violence and match postponements. Smith scored 19 points with the boot as Pukke qualified for their third consecutive final, beating  35–7 in Johannesburg. After two consecutive final defeats, the NWU Pukke won the Varsity Cup title for the first time after beating  7–6 in the final, with Smith emerging as the match-winner, converting a Marno Redelinghuys try scored some ten minutes into injury time at the end of the match.

He started nine matches, scoring 136 points – the second-most behind  fly-half George Whitehead – for the Leopards in the competition before linking up with the Sharks' Super Rugby squad. However, he could not help the Leopards to qualify for the 2016 Currie Cup Premier Division by finishing in the top three non-franchise teams, with the team instead qualifying for the First Division, where they could attempt to defend their title.

Sharks

He made his Super Rugby debut ten minutes into the second half, replacing fullback Odwa Ndungane in a 10–37 defeat in Johannesburg.

Cheetahs

From 2018 to 2020, Smith was included in the  squad for Pro 14 team as well as Super Rugby Unlocked in the end of 2020. He played also the Currie Cup with  until January 2021.

Rugby international career

In 2018 Smith was named in the South Africa Sevens squad for the 2018 Hong Kong Sevens.

References

South African rugby union players
Living people
1993 births
Sportspeople from Paarl
Rugby union fly-halves
Rugby union wings
Rugby union fullbacks
Leopards (rugby union) players
Sharks (rugby union) players
Sharks (Currie Cup) players
Cheetahs (rugby union) players
Free State Cheetahs players
Benetton Rugby players
Rugby union players from the Western Cape